The Balder is an English river that rises on the eastern slope of Stainmore Common in the Pennine Chain and flows eastwards for about 13 miles (21 km) to the River Tees at Cotherstone.

The River Balder is in County Durham. The head of the valley is a bleak moorland, with hills around it exceeding 500 m (1640 ft).

The River Balder enters Balderhead Reservoir about 7 km from the source, at around 330 m (1080 ft). It spills into two more reservoirs further down Baldersdale: Blackton Reservoir and Hury Reservoir.

The scenery becomes gentler as it descends past Baldersdale Youth Hostel. The distinctive flat peak of Goldsborough to the south is passed before the valley begins to open out as the river enters Blackton Reservoir at around 280 m (920 ft).

The course of the valley carries on at a virtually exactly east direction as the River Balder enters Hury Reservoir at about 260 m (850 ft), passing the village of Hury which lies to the north.

The river now begins to twist and turn and is crossed by the Balder Railway Viaduct, which was used by the Barnard Castle to Middleton-in-Teesdale railway line before it was closed.

It finally joins the River Tees at Cotherstone, at a height of about 160 m (520 ft).

See also

Baldersdale
Rivers of the United Kingdom

External links

Balder